Chaqar Shir Melli (also Romanized as Chaqar Shīr Mellī and Chaqar Shīr Melī) is a village in Kongor Rural District, in the Central District of Kalaleh County, Golestan Province, Iran. At the 2006 census, its population was 742, in 171 families.

References 

Populated places in Kalaleh County